Major Harris III (February 9, 1947 – November 9, 2012) was an American R&B singer, associated with the Philadelphia soul sound and the Delfonics (early 1970s–1974). His biggest hit as a solo artist was the 1975 single "Love Won't Let Me Wait".

Life and career
Harris was born in Richmond, Virginia, United States. Early in his career, Harris sang with groups such as the Charmers, the Teenagers, the Jarmels, and Nat Turner Rebellion, which also featured his songwriting brother, Joseph B. Jefferson, and recorded a few solo 7" records on the Laurie and Okeh labels. In the early 1970s, he took over from Randy Cain as a member of the Delfonics; he quit the group to go solo in 1974. Signing with Atlantic Records, Harris scored a string of R&B hits in the United States, including the top ten single "Love Won't Let Me Wait", which peaked at #5 in the US Billboard Hot 100 chart and #37 in the UK Singles Chart in September 1975. Written by Bobby Eli and Vinnie Barrett, "Love Won't Let Me Wait" was awarded a gold disc by the R.I.A.A. on 25 June 1975.

In 1984, Harris recorded the LP I Believe in Love on Streetwave Records, the title track of the same name which did receive airplay that year on BBC Radio 1 from DJ Robbie Vincent. However, the album had limited success.

When his success as a soloist subsided, Harris returned to the Delfonics, and continued to tour with one of two touring ensembles that used the name in the 1990s and 2000s. Major was a cousin to the Philadelphia record producer and arranger, Norman Harris.

Harris died in a Richmond, Virginia, hospital from congestive heart and lung failure at the age of 65.

Discography

Studio albums

Compilation albums
 The Best of Now and Then (WMOT Records, 1981)

Singles

See also
List of artists who reached number one on the Billboard R&B chart
List of current Atlantic Records artists
List of 1970s one-hit wonders in the United States

References

External links
 
 

1947 births
2012 deaths
Singers from Virginia
20th-century African-American male singers
African-American male singers
American soul singers
Musicians from Richmond, Virginia
Atlantic Records artists
21st-century African-American people